The trial of the Nine Trey Gangsters was a criminal case against eleven alleged members and associates of the street gang Nine Trey Gangsters. The case is notable for its inclusion of rapper 6ix9ine and his associate Shotti as defendants. 

The men were indicted on charges related to racketeering, weapon possession, and conspiracy to commit murder. 6ix9ine was quickly made a person of interest in these charges and was apprehended alongside five other men on November 18, 2018, following a five-year joint investigation by the Department of Homeland Security (DHS), the New York Police Department (NYPD), and the Bureau of Alcohol, Tobacco, Firearms and Explosives (ATF).

Upon his arrest, 6ix9ine was initially denied bail and pleaded not guilty to all charges. He later changed his plea to guilty after agreeing to a deal with law enforcement on February 1, 2019. The guilty plea resulted in 6ix9ine admitting his guilt and testifying against his co-defendants, as well as full co-operation and an insistence to commit no further crimes, in exchange for reduced prison time. On December 18, 2019, 6ix9ine was sentenced to two years in prison, pay a $35,000 fine, serve five years of supervised release upon him being released to the public, and complete 1,000 hours of community service. 6ix9ine ended up avoiding a potential minimum sentence of 47 years. 6ix9ine was originally set to be released on November 18, 2020, although his attorney Lance Lazzaro claimed "6ix9ine will be released ahead of schedule." His new release date was set for August 2, 2020, although reports surfaced saying he may be released as early as July 31, 2020. However, on April 1, 2020, federal judge Paul Engelmayer ordered 6ix9ine to serve the remainder of his sentence in home confinement starting the next day due to him suffering from asthma which makes him particularly vulnerable to COVID-19.

Background

In October 2018, 6ix9ine was sentenced to two years' probation and 1,000 hours of community service after pleading guilty to federal racketeering and firearms charges.  To celebrate receiving probation instead of a jail sentence, 6ix9ine went to go have dinner with a music executive in New York City. His entourage was not allowed in by security, and this led to a fight that ended with one person being shot. Two members of 6ix9ine's entourage were charged with gang assault. 6ix9ine's manager Shotti later turned himself in on November 7, 2018, in relation to the fight and was also charged with gang assault.

On November 15, 2018, three days prior to the arrests and a week prior to the scheduled release of his debut album Dummy Boy, 6ix9ine unexpectedly announced on Instagram that he had fired his entire team, including his management. He also cancelled his upcoming tour and said, "Whoever is booking shows for Tekashi 6ix9ine, is stealing your fucking money."

Arrest and guilty plea

November 2018–January 2019: 'Not guilty' plea
On the night of November 18, 2018, six men were arrested by ATF agents in New York City: 6ix9ine, Shotti, Jamel "Mel Murda" Jones, Fuguan "Fu Banga" Lovick, Jesnel "Ish" Butler, and Faheem "Crippy" Walter. The next night while being detained at the Brooklyn Metropolitan Detention Center, 6ix9ine was confronted by inmates affiliated with the rival Crips gang. Prison staff intervened and quickly transferred 6ix9ine to a different facility to eliminate any future gang threats. On November 22, 2018, a seventh man, Roland "Ro Murda" Martin, was arrested and charged with crimes related to the case. 6ix9ine's arrest caused his highly anticipated debut album Dummy Boy to be delayed indefinitely a day before its scheduled release. After an online leak, Dummy Boy was released on November 27, 2018, and managed to reach number 2 on the Billboard 200 within only three days of charting.

On November 26, 2018, 6ix9ine pleaded not guilty and was denied bail, with a court date set for September 4, 2019. 6ix9ine's lawyer continued to plea that his client was "...completely innocent of all charges being brought against him... An entertainer who portrays a 'gangster image' to promote his music does not make him a member of an enterprise." An eighth defendant, Aaron "Bat" Young, was charged on December 19, 2018.

February 2019–present: Co-operation with prosecutors

On January 22, 2019, three other members of the Nine Trey Gangsters were charged as part of the investigation: Kintea "Kooda B" McKenzie, Denard "Drama" Butler, and Anthony "Harv" Ellison. Kooda B was indicted for attempting to shoot American rapper Chief Keef in June 2018. 6ix9ine admitted that after becoming embroiled in an online feud with Chief Keef, he offered $20,000 to Kooda B to carry out the shooting. Kooda B carried out the attack outside the W Hotel in Manhattan, though no one was injured. After the shooting, Kooda B allegedly met with 6ix9ine and Shotti, settling for a payment of $10,000 for the attack.

Drama was indicted for taking part in a separate attempted shooting of Chief Keef on July 16, 2018, where a bystander was injured by the gunfire.
Harv was indicted for kidnapping and assaulting 6ix9ine on July 22, 2018, after he claimed 6ix9ine disrespected the Nine Treys. At the time, 6ix9ine reported the incident to police in July 2018, claiming that he had been pistol-whipped and forced in a car, but soon became uncooperative during the initial investigation.

On January 23, 2019, 6ix9ine changed his plea to guilty to all nine charges against him, and admitted to being a member of the Nine Trey Gangsters. 6ix9ine pledged to cooperate with prosecutors against others. As part of the plea agreement, 6ix9ine will not be fully prosecuted for any of his nine charges as long as he fully cooperates in testifying against others and commits no further crimes. Following 6ix9ine's guilty plea, prosecutors leveled additional firearms and racketeering charges against Shotti.

6ix9ine's lawyer Dawn Florio began devising a plan to get him out of federal custody before September 2019 if the other co-defendants take plea deals to avoid a trial. On March 28, 2019, Shotti became the second co-defendant to enter a guilty plea. Shotti stated that "[6ix9ine] broke every code. But I forgive the little nigga after all that. It's all good", and noted that "Treyway still stands strong. I want that to be known." In September 2019, Shotti was sentenced to 15 years in prison after pleading guilty to one count of firearm possession during a crime and one count of firearm discharge during a crime.

On April 2, 2019, Jesnel "Ish" Butler pleaded guilty to one firearms charge involving the April 2018 robbery of a backpack belonging to "Scum Lord D!zzy", the owner of 6ix9ine's label ScumGang. The next day, Crippy pleaded guilty for involvement in the robbery as well. Mel Murda also pleaded guilty to one count of racketeering conspiracy and one count of participating in a narcotics distribution conspiracy for helping to move heroin and fentanyl. On April 19, 2019, Bat pleaded guilty, becoming the sixth of the 11 defendants that have entered a guilty plea in the case.

List of co-defendants

Timeline & Co-Defendants of trial

The trial and its testimonies began on September 16, 2019 with 6ix9ine testifying for the government the next day. He disclosed the gang's inner structure and activities and later mentioned fellow rappers Jim Jones and Cardi B as members of various gangs.

On October 3, defendants Anthony "Harv" Ellison and Aljermiah "Nuke" Mack were found guilty on kidnapping and racketeering charges, and currently face up to life in prison.

On December 18, 6ix9ine was sentenced to 2 years in prison minus the 13 months already served, and 5 years of supervised liberty. On Thursday, April 2, 2020, 6ix9ine's lawyer, Dawn Florio, confirmed with XXL magazine that the court decided to allow the rapper to be released from prison and into home confinement. This was after 6ix9ine requested to serve the remainder of his prison sentence at home stating he was at a higher risk of contracting the COVID-19 virus due to his pre-existing asthma and bronchitis conditions. He was originally set to be released on August 2, 2020.

Notes

References

External links
"Recording Artist And Performer Tekashi 6ix 9ine And Five Other Members And Associates Of Violent New York City Gang Charged In Manhattan Federal Court With Racketeering And Firearms Offenses", press release by the United States Department of Justice (DOJ)
"Performer Tekashi 6ix 9ine, 5 others charged with racketeering and firearms offenses in New York", news release by the U.S. Immigration and Customs Enforcement (ICE)

6ix9ine
2010s trials
Murder trials
Nine Trey Gangsters
September 2019 events in the United States
21st-century American trials